Thomas Hardy (1840–1928) was an English novelist, short-story writer and poet.

Tom Hardy (born 1977) is an English stage, film and television actor.

Thomas or Tom Hardy may also refer to:

Academia and science 

 Thomas Hardy (minister) (1747–1798), Scottish minister and professor of ecclesiastical history
 Thomas Duffus Hardy (1804–1878), English antiquary and archivist
 Thomas Lionel Hardy (1887–1969), British physician and gastroenterologist

Arts and entertainment 

 Thomas Hardy (English painter) (1757–1804), English painter whose works include a portrait of Joseph Haydn
 Thomas Bush Hardy (1842–1897), British marine painter and watercolourist
 Tom Hardy (designer) (born 1946), American design strategist
Thee Tom Hardy, American rapper formerly signed to It's a Wonderful World Music Group

Fictional characters 

 Thomas Hardy, a fictional character played by Bruce Willis in the 1993 film Striking Distance
 Tom Hardy, a fictional character played by John Travolta in the 2003 film Basic
 Tom Hardy, a fictional character on the soap opera General Hospital
 Tommy Hardy, a fictional character on the soap opera General Hospital

Government, military, and politics
 Thomas Hardy (political reformer) (1752–1832), British political reformer and an object of the 1794 Treason Trials
 Thomas Hardy (Royal Navy officer, died 1732) (1666–1732), admiral and member of parliament for Weymouth and Melcombe Regis
 Sir Thomas Hardy, 1st Baronet (1769–1839), British naval officer

Sports
Tom Hardy (soccer), American soccer defender
Thomas Hardy (rugby league) (fl. 1930s–1940s), English rugby league footballer

Other uses 

 Thomas Hardy (winemaker) (1830–1912), Australian founder of the Hardy Wine Company